Bandy at the 2019 Winter Universiade was held from 1 to 10 March (men's tournament) and from 1 to 8 March (women's tournament) at the Yenisey Stadium in Krasnoyarsk. For the first time bandy was a sport at the program of the Universiade. It had bigger spectator crowds than any other sport.

Venues

Men's tournament

Preliminary round

All times are local (UTC+7).

Playoff round

Bracket

Semifinals

Bronze medal game

Gold medal game

Women's tournament
The 2019 Winter Universiade saw four national women's bandy teams compete for gold in women's bandy. The four competing nations included: Russia, Sweden, Norway, and the USA.

Preliminary round

All times are local (UTC+7).

Playoff round

Bracket

Semifinals

Bronze medal game

Gold medal game

References

External links
Results
Results Book – Bandy

Bandy
2019
2019
Winter Universiade